Moulmein (recently "Mawlamyine") is the fourth largest city in Myanmar (Burma).

Moulmein may also refer to:
 Moulmein Road, a local street in Singapore that is named after the city mentioned above.
 Jalan Moulmein, a local street in George Town, Malaysia that is named after the city mentioned above. 
 Moulmein–Kallang Group Representation Constituency, a former electoral ward in Singapore.